Raavu Ramesh Rao (born 25 May 1968) is an Indian actor known for his works primarily in Telugu cinema, Telugu theatre, and television. He is the son of veteran actor Rao Gopal Rao. Rao Ramesh initially appeared in Seema Simham (2002), Okkadunnadu (2007), before getting a breakthrough role in Krish's Gamyam (2008), portraying a reformed Naxalite, he received critical acclaim for his portrayal and the film went on to become one of the highest grossing Telugu films of the year.

His subsequent films, Kotha Bangaru Lokam (2008), Avakai Biryani (2008) and S. S. Rajamouli's Magadheera (2009) were box office hits, while his role in the latter as a hunchbacked old Tantric won him further acclaim. Throughout the early 2010s, Rao Ramesh became a popular supporting actor and described that by 2015, he was in the "best phase of his career".

Early life 
Rao Ramesh was born on 25 May 1968 in Srikakulam, Andhra Pradesh, to actor Rao Gopal Rao. He was brought up in Chennai. His initial schooling was from Sri Ramakrishna Mission School in T. Nagar and later completed a degree in Communications before getting into Still-photography. He later joined K. S. Prakasa Rao, a cinematographer and brother of K. Raghavendra Rao, as an assistant before going to Bangalore to learn industrial photography.

Early career 
 
Rao began acting in a Television series directed by Ghantasala Ratna Kumar, but the production was shelved amidst schedules. He subsequently moved back to Chennai and started acting in soap operas such as Pavithra Bandham and Kalavari Kodalu, and shot for over 1000 episodes in the space of four and half years.

Filmography

Telugu

Tamil

Kannada

Television

References

External links

Living people
Indian male film actors
21st-century Indian male actors
Male actors from Andhra Pradesh
Telugu male actors
People from Srikakulam
Male actors in Telugu cinema
Indian male stage actors
Telugu comedians
Nandi Award winners
Male actors in Telugu theatre
Indian male comedians
1968 births
Male actors in Tamil cinema
Male actors in Kannada cinema